Henri Cohen (died 1930) was a Belgian sportsman who specialized in water polo.

See also
 List of Olympic medalists in water polo (men)
 List of select Jewish water polo players

References

External links
 

Year of birth missing
1930 deaths
Olympic medalists in water polo
Belgian male water polo players
Medalists at the 1900 Summer Olympics
Olympic silver medalists for Belgium
Jewish Belgian sportspeople
Olympic water polo players of Belgium
Water polo players at the 1900 Summer Olympics
Date of death missing
Place of birth missing
Place of death missing